is a Japanese football player. She plays for Tokyo Verdy Beleza in the WE League. She played for Japan national team.

Club career
Muramatsu was born in Setagaya, Tokyo on October 23, 1994. She was promoted to Nippon TV Beleza from youth team in 2011. She was selected Best Eleven in 2015 and 2016.

National team career
In 2010, Muramatsu was selected Japan U-17 national team for 2010 U-17 World Cup. She played 5 games and Japan won 2nd place. In August 2015, she was selected Japan national team for 2015 East Asian Cup. At this competition, on August 4, she debuted against South Korea. She played 4 games for Japan until 2016.

National team statistics

References

External links

Japan Football Association

1994 births
Living people
Association football people from Tokyo
Japanese women's footballers
Japan women's international footballers
Nadeshiko League players
Nippon TV Tokyo Verdy Beleza players
Women's association football defenders